John Martin Bland (born 6 March 1947), known as Martin Bland, is a British statistician. He has been professor of health statistics at the University of York since 2003. Bland is known for his work on medical measurement, particularly methodology for method comparison studies such as the Bland–Altman plot.

Bland was born in Stockport and obtained a BSc, MSc and diploma from Imperial College, London, followed by a PhD in epidemiology from the University of London. Between 1976 and 2003 he worked at St. George's Hospital Medical School, University of London.

Books

References

External links
 Personal home page at the University of York

British statisticians
Living people
1947 births
Academics of the University of York
Alumni of Imperial College London
People from Stockport